The Girl from Nowhere is a 1919 American action adventure drama silent black and white directed and written by Wilfred Lucas and Bess Meredyth and starring Cleo Madison and Frank Brownlee.

Cast
 Cleo Madison as Gal
 Wilfred Lucas as Diamond Terry
 Frank Brownlee as Klondike Jim
 Val Paul as John Waterman
 Mary Talbot as Lizzie Lou
 John Cook as Dr. Ferguson

References

External links
 

1919 films
1910s action adventure films
1910s adventure drama films
American action adventure films
American adventure drama films
American black-and-white films
American silent films
Films about amnesia
1910s American films
Silent American drama films